Vave may refer to:

Value Analysis/Value Engineering (VA/VE)
Siosaia Vave, Tongan Australian rugby league player

See also
 
 Vavel